Holger Norman-Hansen (2 January 1899  –  26 March 1984) was a Danish chess master.

Norman-Hansen played for Denmark in Chess Olympiads:
 In the 1st Chess Olympiad at London 1927 (+11 -2 =2);
 In the 2nd Chess Olympiad at The Hague 1928 (+4 -7 =5);
 In the 3rd unofficial Chess Olympiad at Munich 1936 (+8 -6 =5).
He won individual gold medal and team silver medal in 1927.

He was Danish Champion in 1939 after a play-off. He also finished 1st= in 1936 but lost the play-off.

References

1899 births
1984 deaths
Danish chess players
Chess Olympiad competitors
20th-century chess players